The 500 West Monroe Building is a skyscraper in Chicago, Illinois. The building rises 600 feet (183 m) in Chicago's Near West Side neighborhood. It contains 45 floors, and was completed in 1992. The 500 W Monroe Building currently stands as the 44th-tallest building in the city. The architectural firm who designed the building was Skidmore, Owings & Merrill, the same firm who designed Chicago's Sears Tower and John Hancock Center and the Burj Khalifa in Dubai.

The 500 West Monroe Building currently stands as the tallest building in Chicago situated west of the Chicago River. One year after its completion, in 1993, the building won the "Best Structure Award" from the Structural Engineers Association of Illinois. The building's design incorporated a unique turret-like structure on the structure's southeastern corner. The turret stands as the building's highest architectural point, and is illuminated in white lights at night.

Tenants
GE Healthcare
GE Transportation

See also
 List of tallest buildings in Chicago
 Chicago architecture

References

Skyscraper office buildings in Chicago
Skidmore, Owings & Merrill buildings
Leadership in Energy and Environmental Design gold certified buildings
1992 establishments in Illinois
Office buildings completed in 1992